José Antonio Merín (born 11 July 1970) is a Spanish former competitive rower, specializing in double sculls. He competed in that event at the 1992 Summer Olympics and the 1996 Summer Olympics.

References

1970 births
Living people
Spanish male rowers
Olympic rowers of Spain
Rowers at the 1992 Summer Olympics
Rowers at the 1996 Summer Olympics
People from Montsià
Sportspeople from the Province of Tarragona